Alianza may refer to:

Sport
 Alianza Atlético, Peru
 Alianza F.C., San Salvador

 Alianza F.C. (Panama)
 Alianza Universidad in Huánuco, Peru
 Alianza Lima, Peru
 Alianza Petrolera F.C., Colombia

Music
 Alianza (Argentine band)
 Alianza (Anglo-Chilean band)
 Alianza (album)

Other uses
 Alianza Puertorriqueña, a defunct political party in Puerto Rico
 Alliance for Work, Justice and Education, a former party coalition in Argentina
 Alianza por Chile, a former right-wing political coalition in Chile
 Alianza Islámica, Latino Muslim organization
 Alianza Uruguaya por el Sufragio Femenino, a Uruguayan women's suffrage organization

See also
Alliance (disambiguation)